Elachista strepens is a moth in the family Elachistidae. It was described by Edward Meyrick in 1922. It is found in India (Assam).

The wingspan is about 5 mm. The forewings are dark ashy-fuscous with a cloudy whitish dot on the costa at two-fifths and one at four-fifths. There are several white terminal specks. The hindwings are dark grey.

References

Moths described in 1922
strepens
Moths of Asia